Louise F. Titchener (born 1941 in Detroit, Michigan) is an American novelist. She wrote under various pseudonyms: Alyssa Howard (with Eileen Buckholtz, Ruth Glick, and Carolyn Males), Alexis Hill, Alexis Hill Jordan, Anne Silverlock, Jane Silverwood, and Tess Marlowe (with Ruth Glick), and Clare Richards and Clare Richmond (with Carolyn Males).

Biography
Louise Titchener was born in Detroit, Michigan, United States. She married with a philosophy student and moved to Ohio, where she obtained a master's degree and taught freshman English and her husband became a Philosophy Professor. The marriage had two sons, who grew up in Maryland. She now is a grandmother.

She is member of the Washington Romance Writers, a chapter of the Romance Writers of America.

Awards
Love is Elected (1982) Romantic Times Nominee for Best Romance
"Déjà Vu" (1996) A TRR 5 Heart Keeper Winner
"Buried in Baltimore" (2001) EPPIE 2002 Winner

Bibliography

As Alyssa Howard

Single novels
Love is Elected (1982)
Southern Persuasion (1983)

As Alexis Hill

Single novels
In the Arms of Love (1983 Feb)

As Alexis Hill Jordan

Single novels
Brian's Captive (1983 Aug)
Reluctant Merger (1983 Dec)
Summer Wine (1984 Jul)
Beginner's Luck (1984 Dec)
Mistaken Image (1985 Mar)
Hopelessly Devoted (1985 Jul)
Summer Stars (1985 Sep)
Stolen Passions (1986 Aug)

As Anne Silverlock

Single novels
Casanova's Master (1984)
Aphrodite's Promise (1985)
An Invincible Love (1985)
With Each Caress (1985)
Fantasy Lover (1986)
In the Heat of the Sun (1986)

Omnibus
The Best of Anne Silverlock: With Each Caress / Casanova's Master (1992)

As Clare Richards

Single novels
Renaissance Summer (1985 Mar)

As Clare Richmond

Single novels
Runaway heart (1986 Nov)
Bride's Inn (1987 Sep)
Pirate's legacy (1990 Jul)
Hawaiian Heat (1993 Feb)

As Tess Marlowe

Single novels
Indiscreet (1988)

As Jane Silverwood

The Byrnside Inheritance
High Stakes (1991)
Dark Waters (1991)
Bright Secrets (1991)

Single novels
Voyage of the Heart (1985)
A Permanent Arrangement (1986)
The Tender Trap (1987)
Slow Melt (1987)
Beyond Mere Words (1988)
Handle with Care (1989)
Eye of the Jaguar (1993)
Silent Starlight (1994)

As Louise Titchener

Toni Credella Mysteries Series

Homebody (1993)
Buried in Baltimore (2001)
Burned in Baltimore (2003)
Bumped Off in Baltimore (2005)

Baltimore Historical Mysteries Series
Gunshy (2004)
Malpractice (2006)

Fortunes Series Multi-Author
6. The Dress Circle (1988)

Single Novels
Greenfire (1993)
Mantrap (1994)
Déjà Vu (1996)

References and sources

1941 births
Living people
American romantic fiction writers
20th-century American novelists
21st-century American novelists
20th-century American women writers
21st-century American women writers
Women romantic fiction writers
American women novelists
20th-century pseudonymous writers
21st-century pseudonymous writers
Pseudonymous women writers